The Mesha Stele, also known as the Moabite Stone, is a stele dated around 840 BCE containing a significant Canaanite inscription in the name of King Mesha of Moab (a kingdom located in modern Jordan). Mesha tells how Chemosh, the god of Moab, had been angry with his people and had allowed them to be subjugated to the Kingdom of Israel, but at length, Chemosh returned and assisted Mesha to throw off the yoke of Israel and restore the lands of Moab. Mesha also describes his many building projects. It is written in a variant of the Phoenician alphabet, closely related to the Paleo-Hebrew script.

The stone was discovered intact by Frederick Augustus Klein, an Anglican missionary, at the site of ancient Dibon (now Dhiban, Jordan), in August 1868.  A "squeeze" (a papier-mâché impression) had been obtained by a local Arab on behalf of Charles Simon Clermont-Ganneau, an archaeologist based in the French consulate in Jerusalem. The next year, the stele was smashed into several fragments by the Bani Hamida tribe, seen as an act of defiance against the Ottoman authorities who had pressured the Bedouins to hand over the stele so that it could be given to Germany. Clermont-Ganneau later managed to acquire the fragments and piece them together thanks to the impression made before the stele's destruction.

The Mesha Stele, the first major epigraphic Canaanite inscription found in the region of Palestine, the longest Iron Age inscription ever found in the region, constitutes the major evidence for the Moabite language, and is a "corner-stone of Semitic epigraphy", and history. The stele, whose story parallels, with some differences, an episode in the Bible's Books of Kings (2 Kings 3:4–28), provides invaluable information on the Moabite language and the political relationship between Moab and Israel at one moment in the 9th century BCE. It is the most extensive inscription ever recovered that refers to the kingdom of Israel (the "House of Omri"); it bears the earliest certain extrabiblical reference to the Israelite god Yahweh. It is also one of four known contemporary inscriptions containing the name of Israel, the others being the Merneptah Stele, the Tel Dan Stele, and one of the Kurkh Monoliths. Its authenticity has been disputed over the years, and some biblical minimalists suggest the text was not historical, but a biblical allegory. The stele itself is regarded as genuine and historical by the vast majority of biblical archaeologists today. 

The stele has been part of the collection of the Louvre Museum in Paris, France, since 1873.

Description and discovery
The stele is a smoothed block of basalt about a meter tall, 60 cm wide, and 60 cm thick, bearing a surviving inscription of 34 lines.

The stone was discovered intact by Frederick Augustus Klein, an Anglican missionary, at the site of ancient Dibon (now Dhiban, Jordan), in August 1868. Klein was led to it by Emir Sattam Al-Fayez, son of the Bani Sakhr King Fendi Al-Fayez, although neither of them could read the text. At that time, amateur explorers and archaeologists were scouring the Levant for evidence proving the historicity of the Bible. News of the finding set off a race between France, Britain, and Germany to acquire the piece.

A "squeeze" (a papier-mâché impression) of the full stele had been obtained just prior to its destruction. Ginsberg's translation of the official report, "Über die Auffindung der Moabitischen Inschrift", stated that Charles Simon Clermont-Ganneau, an archaeologist based in the French consulate in Jerusalem, sent an Arab named Yacoub Caravacca to obtain the squeeze as he "did not want to venture to undertake the very costly [and dangerous] journey" himself. Caravacca was injured by the local Bedouin while obtaining the squeeze, and one of his two accompanying horsemen protected the squeeze by tearing it still damp from the stone in seven fragments before escaping.

In November 1869 the stele was broken by the local Bedouin tribe (the Bani Hamida) after the Ottoman government became involved in the ownership dispute. The previous year the Bani Hamida had been defeated by an expedition to Balqa led by Reşid Pasha, the Wali of Damascus. Knowing that a demand to give up the stone to the German Consulate had been ordered by the Ottomans, and finding that the ruler of Salt was about to put pressure upon them, they heated the stele in a bonfire, threw cold water upon it and broke it to pieces with boulders.

On 8 February 1870, George Grove of the Palestine Exploration Fund announced the find of the stele in a letter to The Times, attributing the discovery to Charles Warren. On 17 February 1870, the 24-year-old Clermont-Ganneau published the first detailed announcement of the stele in the Revue de l’Instruction Publique. This was followed a month later by a note from Frederick Augustus Klein published in the Pall Mall Gazette, describing his discovery of the stele in August 1868:

Pieces of the original stele containing most of the inscription, 613 letters out of about a thousand, were later recovered and pieced together. Of the existing stele fragments, the top right fragment contains 150 letters, the bottom right fragment contains 358 letters, the middle-right contains 38, and the rest of the fragments contain 67 letters. The remainder of the stele was reconstructed by Ganneau from the squeeze obtained by Caravacca.

Text

Original

The inscription, known as KAI 181 is pictured to the right, and presented here after Compston, 1919, to be read right to left. : 

<div style="text-align:right;">
 

 

 

 

 

 

 

 

 

 

 

 

 

 

 

 

 

 

 

 

 

 

 

 

 

 

 

 

 

 

 ............

It describes:
 How Moab was oppressed by Omri King of Israel and his son as the result of the anger of the god Chemosh
 Mesha's victories over Omri's son (not named) and the men of Gad at Ataroth, Nebo and Jehaz
 His building projects, restoring the fortifications of his strong places and building a palace and reservoirs for water
 His wars against the Horonaim
 A now-lost conclusion in the destroyed final lines

Translations
Here is the beginning of a relatively recent transliteration and translation by Alviero Niccacci from his article "The Stele of Mesha and the Bible: Verbal System and Narrativity" in Orientalia NOVA SERIES, Vol. 63, No. 3 (1994), pp. 226-248. 

No authoritative full edition of the Moabite inscription remains. The translation used here is that published by James King (1878), based on translations by M. Ganneau and Dr. Ginsberg. Line numbers added to the published version have been needlessly removed. A century and a half of scholarship has greatly improved our understanding of the text, so accessing other translations linked here is recommended, rather than relying on this very outdated one. 

I am Mesha, son of Chemosh-gad, king of Moab, the Dibonite. My father reigned over Moab thirty years, and I have reigned after my father. And I have built this sanctuary for Chemosh in Karchah, a sanctuary of salvation, for he saved me from all aggressors, and made me look upon all mine enemies with contempt. 

Omri was king of Israel, and oppressed Moab during many days, and Chemosh was angry with his aggressions. His son succeeded him, and he also said, I will oppress Moab. In my days he said, Let us go, and I will see my desire upon him and his house, and Israel said, I shall destroy it for ever. Now Omri took the land of Madeba, and occupied it in his day, and in the days of his son, forty years. And Chemosh had mercy on it in my time. And I built Baal-meon and made therein the ditch, and I built Kiriathaim. 

And the men of Gad dwelled in the country of Ataroth from ancient times, and the king of Israel fortified Ataroth. I assaulted the wall and captured it, and killed all the warriors of the city for the well-pleasing of Chemosh and Moab, and I removed from it all the spoil, and offered it before Chemosh in Kirjath; and I placed therein the men of Siran, and the men of Mochrath. And Chemosh said to me, Go take Nebo against Israel, and I went in the night and I fought against it from the break of day till noon, and I took it: and I killed in all seven thousand men...women and maidens, for I devoted them to Ashtar-Chemosh; and I took from it the vessels of Jehovah, and offered them before Chemosh. 

And the king of Israel fortified Jahaz, and occupied it, when he made war against me, and Chemosh drove him out before me, and I took from Moab two hundred men in all, and placed them in Jahaz, and took it to annex it to Dibon. 

I built Karchah the wall of the forest, and the wall of the Hill. I have built its gates and I have built its towers. I have built the palace of the king, and I made the prisons for the criminals within the wall. And there were no wells in the interior of the wall in Karchah. And I said to all the people, 'Make you every man a well in his house.' And I dug the ditch for Karchah with the chosen men of Israel. I built Aroer, and I made the road across the Arnon. I built Beth-Bamoth for it was destroyed. I built Bezer for it was cut down by the armed men of Daybon, for all Daybon was now loyal; and I reigned from Bikran, which I added to my land. And I built Beth-Gamul, and Beth-Diblathaim...Beth Baal-Meon, and I placed there the poor people of the land. 

And as to Horonaim, the men of Edom dwelt therein, on the descent from old. And Chemosh said to me, Go down, make war against Horonaim, and take it. And I assaulted it, And I took it, for Chemosh restored it in my days. Wherefore I made.... ...year...and I....

There is also a more modern translation by W.F. Albright on pages 320-321 of Ancient Near Eastern Texts (ed. Pritchard, 1969):

A yet newer translation was presented in a vici.org page authored by Jona Lendering, author of numerous books on ancient history, who read history at Leiden University (MA 1993), specialized in Mediterranean culture at the Amsterdam Free University (MA 1996), and worked at excavations in Holland (Riethoven) and Greece (Halos), created in 2006, last modified 12 October, 2021.

Interpretation

Analysis

The Mesha Stele is the longest Iron Age inscription ever found in the region, the major evidence for the Moabite language, and a unique record of military campaigns. The occasion was the erection of a sanctuary for Chemosh in Qarho, the acropolis (citadel) of Dibon, Mesha's capital, in thanks for his aid against Mesha's enemies. Chemosh is credited with an important role in the victories of Mesha, but is not mentioned in connection with his building activities, reflecting the crucial need to give recognition to the nation's god in the life-and-death national struggle. The fact that the numerous building projects would have taken years to complete suggests that the inscription was made long after the military campaigns, or at least most of them, and the account of those campaigns reflects a royal ideology that wishes to present the king as the obedient servant of the god. The king also claims to be acting in the national interest by removing Israelite oppression and restoring lost lands, but a close reading of the narrative leaves it unclear whether all the conquered territories were previously Moabite – in three campaign stories, no explicit reference is made to prior Moabite control.

Parallel to 2 Kings 3
The inscription seems to parallel an episode in 2 Kings 3: Jehoram of Israel makes an alliance with Jehoshaphat king of Judah and an unnamed king of Edom (south of Judah) to put down his rebellious vassal Mesha; the three kings have the best of the campaign until Mesha, in desperation, sacrifices to his god Chemosh either his eldest son or the eldest son of the king of Edom; the sacrifice turns the tide, "there came great wrath against Israel", and Mesha apparently achieves victory. This apparent correspondence is the basis of the usual dating of the inscription to about 840 BCE, but André Lemaire has cautioned that the identification is not certain and the stele may be as late as 810 BCE.

Proposed references to David and "House of David"

The discovery of the Tel Dan Stele led to a re-evaluation of the Mesha Stele by some scholars. In 1994, André Lemaire reconstructed BT[D]WD as "House of David", meaning Judah, in line 31. This section is badly damaged, but appears to tell of Mesha's reconquest of the southern lands of Moab, just as the earlier part dealt with victories in the north. Line 31 says that he captured Horonen from someone who was occupying it. Just who the occupants were is unclear. The legible letters were taken by Lemaire to be BT[*]WD, with the square brackets representing a damaged space that probably contained just one letter. This is not universally accepted—Nadav Na'aman, for instance, suggested it as BT[D]WD[H], "House of Daodoh", a local ruling family. Were Lemaire correct, the stele would provide the earliest evidence of the existence of the Judean kingdom and its Davidic dynasty. 

In 2001, Anson Rainey proposed that a two-word phrase in line 12—'R'L DWDH—should be read as a reference an "altar hearth of David" at Ataroth, one of the towns captured by Mesha. The sentence reads: "I (i.e., Mesha) carried from there (Atartoth) the 'R'L of its DWD (or: its 'R'L of DVD) and I dragged it before Chemosh in Qeriot". The meaning of both words is unclear. One line of thought sees 'R'L as the name of a man (literally "El is my light") and translates DWD as "defender", so that the sense of the passage is that Mesha, having conquered Ataroth, dragged its "defender", whose name was "El is my light", to the altar of Chemosh, where he was presumably sacrificed. It seems more likely that some kind of cult-vessel is meant, and other suggestions have included "the lion-statue of its beloved", meaning the city god. 

In 2019, Israel Finkelstein, Nadav Na'aman and Thomas Römer concluded, on the basis of high-resolution photographs of the squeeze, that the monarch mentioned is referred to by three consonants, beginning with 'B', and the most probable candidate is not David, but Balak, a biblical Moabite. Disagreeing, Michael Langlois pointed to his own new imaging methods that "confirm" line 31 contains the phrase "House of David". A similar judgment was expressed by biblical scholar Ronald Hendel, who noted that Balak lived 200 years before David and, therefore, a reference to it would not make sense; Hendel also dismissed Finkelstein's hypothesis as "nothing more than a guess".

Authenticity

In the years following the discovery of the stele a number of scholars questioned its authenticity.

The stele is now regarded as of genuine antiquity by the vast majority of biblical archaeologists on the basis that no other inscriptions in this script or language of comparable age were yet known to scholars at the time of its discovery. At that time the Assyrian lion weights were the oldest Phoenician-style inscription that had been discovered.

The discovery of the Khirbat Ataruz Inscribed Altar inscriptions by archaeologist Chang-ho Ji at an ancient Moabite sanctuary site in Jordan in 2010, provided evidence for the Mesha Stele's authenticity. The stele's genuineness is held as wholly established and undisputed by biblical archaeologists today.

Minimalist views
Thomas L. Thompson, a former professor of theology at the University of Copenhagen, closely associated with the Biblical minimalism movement known as the Copenhagen School, which holds that "Israel" is a problematic concept, believes that the inscription on the Mesha stele is not historical, but an allegory. In 2000, he wrote: "Rather than an historical text, the Mesha inscription belongs to a substantial literary tradition of stories about kings of the past... The phrase "Omri, king of Israel," eponym of the highland patronate Bit Humri, belongs to a theological world of Narnia." This view has received criticism by John Emerton and André Lemaire, who have both reasserted the historical value of the Mesha Stele.

See also
 Kerak Inscription
 Merneptah Stele
 Siloam inscription

References

Bibliography and further reading

External links

 
 Louvre collection – includes a large modern photo of the stele
 Translation from Northwest Semitic Inscriptions
 The Basalt of the Moabite Stone  – A mineralogical analysis of the Moabite Stone, by T.G. Bonney (1902)
 Commentary and a recent translation (last modified 2020)

9th-century BC steles
1868 archaeological discoveries
Ancient Near East
Human sacrifice
KAI inscriptions
Kingdom of Israel (Samaria)
Moabite inscriptions
Near East and Middle East antiquities of the Louvre
Omrides
Victory steles